Free is an album by saxophonist Benny Golson recorded in late 1962 and originally released on the Argo label.

Background
Pianist Tommy Flanagan had played with Golson before; bassist Ron Carter was selected to provide a different approach for the leader; and drummer Art Taylor was a replacement for Philly Joe Jones, who was due to play, but did not go to the studio.

Reception
In the November 7, 1963 issue of Down Beat magazine, critic Harvey Pekar awarded the album 5 stars and said that "Golson's improvising is outstanding; I doubt that he's ever before played as consistently well on record."

The Allmusic review states, "Golson's last album as a leader in which he plays in his Don Byas/Lucky Thompson style (he would soon become a fulltime arranger and, by the time he led his next playing date in 1977, Golson's sound was quite a bit different) finds him in top form". Writing in 2004, critic Bob Blumenthal commented that the album "remains among the highlights of his recording career".

Track listing
All compositions by Benny Golson except as indicated
 "Sock Cha Cha" (Will Davis) – 7:10  
 "Mad About the Boy" (Noël Coward) – 7:15  
 "Just by Myself" – 5:45  
 "Shades of Stein" – 4:30  
 "My Romance" (Lorenz Hart, Richard Rodgers) – 7:30  
 "Just in Time" (Betty Comden, Adolph Green, Jule Styne) – 5:55

Personnel

Musicians
Benny Golson – tenor saxophone
Tommy Flanagan – piano 
Ron Carter – bass
Art Taylor – drums

Production
Esmond Edwards – production
Rudy Van Gelder – recording engineering

References 

Argo Records albums
Benny Golson albums
1963 albums